The Solicitor General of the Navy was an office of the United States Department of the Navy that existed periodically from 1862 until 1929.  In 1941, it was superseded by the permanent office of General Counsel of the Navy.  The Solicitor General of the Navy was the senior legal adviser to the United States Secretary of the Navy.

Solicitors General of the Navy, 1862–1929

References
 History of the Office of General Counsel of the Navy

Solicitor
1862 establishments in the United States